Henry Nuzum (born March 4, 1977) is an American rower. He competed at the 2004 Summer Olympics in Athens, where he placed 6th in the men's double sculls, along with Aquil Abdullah. Nuzum was born in Chapel Hill, North Carolina.  He graduated from Harvard University in 1999.

References

External links

1977 births
Living people
American male rowers
Olympic rowers of the United States
Rowers at the 2000 Summer Olympics
Rowers at the 2004 Summer Olympics
Harvard Crimson rowers